TV Brasil is a Brazilian public television network owned by Empresa Brasil de Comunicação. Its main headquarters are in Brasília, DF and Rio de Janeiro, RJ, with owned-and-operated stations in São Paulo, SP and in São Luís, MA, as well as 21 states where its affiliated broadcasters operate, all components of the Rede Pública de Televisão.

History 
TV Brasil originated from a decree which created Empresa Brasil de Comunicação, the network's maintainer, published on 24 December 2007 in the Diário Oficial da União, Brazil's official gazette. It was generated from the fusion of Empresa Brasileira de Comunicação - Radiobrás and Associação de Comunicação Educativa Roquette Pinto, responsible for the maintenance of the now defunct TVE Brasil - which was replaced by TV Brasil in several cities. The lack of equipment restricted TV Brasil's launching to only three cities (Rio de Janeiro, Brasília and São Luís). Its programming, however, is also available through its official website and cable and satellite television.

Programming
TV Brasil affiliated stations broadcast four hours a day of regional programing. It also broadcast Brazilian films and programs made by other public television channels. The programming of is divided into five daily streams: children, animation, audio-visual, citizenship and sports.

Franklin Martins, Secretary of Social Communication, has commented that TV Brasil's programming is not yet fully prepared and may suffer from late changes. Martins also said he wished to use public opinion polls to determine the programming.

Stations

Among self-owned and affiliated stations, TV Brasil reaches over 30 municipalities throughout all regions of Brazil. On the rest of the country, TV Brasil's availability is limited to satellite and cable television. Its live programming can also be watched on the network's official website.

References

External links 

 

 
Empresa Brasil de Comunicação
Mass media in Rio de Janeiro (city)
Television channels and stations established in 2007
Brazilian companies established in 2007